Bee Branch Township is a township in Chariton County, in the U.S. state of Missouri.

Bee Branch Township takes its name from Bee Branch creek.

References

Townships in Missouri
Townships in Chariton County, Missouri